Hindu Matha Dharma Paripalana (HMDP) Sabha, Moothakunnam, Ernakulam was established in 1882 under the guidance of Asthavadhani Parishudha Vishista Paranatha Khanadana Venkatagiri Sasthrikal, an Andhrite theologist. He was the founder president of HMDP Sabha. Erezhath U Krishnan Vaidyan, Srimoolam Praja Sabha member, as founder secretary, motivated by the teachings of Sree Narayana Guru.

A number of educational institutions were established and run by the Sabha.
 Sree Narayana Mangalam  Institute of Management & Technology, Maliankara, Moothakunnam Ernakulam
 Sree Narayana Mangalam  Institute of Science & Technology, Maliankara, Moothakunnam Ernakulam
 Sree Narayana Mangalam  Arts and Science college, Maliankara, Moothakunnam Ernakulam
 Sree Narayana Mangalam  Kindergarten, Moothakunnam Ernakulam
 Sree Narayana Mangalam  LP School, Maliankara, Moothakunnam Ernakulam
 Sree Narayana Mangalam  High School, Moothakunnam Ernakulam
 Sree Narayana Mangalam  Higher secondary school, Moothakunnam, Ernakulam
 Sree Narayana Mangalam institute of Teacher Education, Moothakunnam Ernakulam
 Sree Narayana Mangalam  Training college with B.Ed. & M.Ed., Moothakunnam Ernakulam
 Sree Narayana Mangalam  Industrial training centre Moothakunnam Ernakulam
 Sree Narayana Mangalam Polytechnic College, Maliankara

Universities and colleges in Ernakulam district
Educational institutions established in 1882
1882 establishments in India